WMFN (640 AM) is a radio station broadcasting a black-oriented news format. The station is owned by Birach Broadcasting. Licensed to Peotone, Illinois and currently serving Chicago, it first began broadcasting in Zeeland, Michigan in 1990 under the WBMX call sign, serving Muskegon and Grand Rapids. The station has since been through a number of different formats and call signs, and changed market areas, which is rare for a station.

640 kilohertz is a United States clear-channel frequency, on which KFI in Los Angeles and KYUK in Bethel, Alaska are the dominant Class A stations.

AM 640 was originally a MOR station in 1990 when it signed on as WBMX, using the call sign that had recently been vacated by a popular urban contemporary station in Chicago, Illinois.  The following year, the owners of WROR-FM 98.5 in Boston, Massachusetts, bought the WBMX call letters from 640 in order to debut "Mix 98.5" there; in return, AM 640 received the WROR calls.  Its format did not change.  In 1993, WROR (AM) was sold and converted to Radio AAHS as WISZ, freeing the WROR calls to be used again in Boston, where they were again placed beginning in 1996.

For a time, the station also played adult standards (Westwood One's AM Only) at night as a continuation of daytimer sister station WMJH 810 AM's format. Since WMJH was known at the time as "Majic 810," WMFN's nighttime standards programming was called "Night Majic."

In 1995 am 640 became WMFN, taking a sports format branded "West Michigan's Fan".  During its sports talk days former NFL linebacker Ray Bentley hosted an afternoon program. In 1999 WMFN adopted a Business News format branded "West Michigan's Financial News".  Starting in 2000 WMFN evolved into a News Talk Sports format eventually becoming "Hot Talk 640". In 2005 WMFN's talk format was dropped in favor of an Adult Urban Contemporary format branded "Smooth Vibes AM 640".

From about 2006 until November 2008, the station was leased to Tyrone Bynum, a controversial talk show host and deejay who hosted many of his programs on this station, which went under the name "Smooth Vibes"; during periods when there was no talk programming, Bynum (or his staffers) would play Urban Adult Contemporary music.

In November 2008, due to low advertising revenues, Bynum opted not to renew his lease with Birach; on November 7, 2008, the station began carrying Regional Mexican programming, moved from WMJH. Bynum soon relaunched "Smooth Vibes" as an online-only station free from music licensing fees.

As "La Poderosa," the station became the exclusive Regional Mexican station in West Michigan, as former competitor stations WYGR and WNWZ have switched to other formats. The "Poderosa" format has since moved back to WMJH, which has also launched an FM translator at 93.3.  At that time, WMFN became Radio Activa.

In 2014, the FCC allowed the station to be moved to south of Chicago, to be licensed to the town of Peotone, Illinois. The station aired a Spanish Contemporary format. In summer of 2018, the station aired a Polish language format, Polski FM, simulcasting 92.7 WCPY.

On July 14, 2022, at 1 p.m., WMFN changed their format from Regional Mexican to African-American-oriented news from the Black Information Network.  This change positioned the station in competition with Audacy’s heritage all-news stations WBBM/WCFS-FM

References

External links
WMFN (Corporate) Website
Michiguide.com - WMFN History

MFN
Radio stations established in 1990
Birach Broadcasting Corporation stations
All-news radio stations in the United States
Black Information Network stations